Edward A. Evans (born September 15, 1964) is a Canadian former rugby union player who played as prop.

Career
Evans first played at club level for UBC Old Boys Ravens until 1992, when he moved to Japan to play for IBM. He debuted for the Canada national team on 8 November 1986, against USA in Tucson. He played three World Cups, in 1987, 1991 and 1995. His last cap for Canada was against Argentina, in Buenos Aires, on 22 August 1998. He retired from his playing career in 2002, to later launch X-treme Rugby Wear, a Thailand-based sportswear company owned by Evans.

References

External links 
Scrum.Com

1964 births
Living people
Sportspeople from British Columbia
People from Terrace, British Columbia
Canadian expatriate sportspeople in Japan
Canadian rugby union players
Canada international rugby union players
University of British Columbia alumni
Rugby union props